Finasteride/tadalafil, sold under the brand name Entadfi, is a fixed-dose combination medication used for the treatment of benign prostatic hyperplasia (BPH). It contains finasteride and tadalafil. It is taken by mouth.

It was approved for medical use in the United States in December 2021.

Medical uses 
Finasteride/tadalafil is indicated to treat benign prostatic hyperplasia (BPH) in men.

References

External links 
 
 

Combination drugs